This page provides supplementary chemical data on ruthenium(IV) oxide.

Thermodynamic properties

Spectral data

Structure and properties data

Material Safety Data Sheet 

The handling of this chemical may require notable safety precautions. Safety information can be found on the Material Safety Datasheet (MSDS) for this chemical or from a reliable source, such as SIRI.

References

Chemical data pages
Chemical data pages cleanup